Melanitis is a genus of butterflies from the subfamily Satyrinae in the family Nymphalidae.

Species
Melanitis amabilis (Boisduval, 1832)
Melanitis ansorgei Rothschild, 1904 – blue evening brown
Melanitis atrax C. & R. Felder, 1863
Melanitis belinda Grose-Smith, 1895
Melanitis boisduvalia C. & R. Felder, 1863
Melanitis constantia (Cramer, [1777])
Melanitis leda (Linnaeus, 1758) – common evening brown
Melanitis libya Distant, 1882 – violet-eyed evening brown
Melanitis phedima (Cramer, [1780]) – dark evening brown
Melanitis pyrrha Röber, 1887
Melanitis velutina (C. & R. Felder, [1867])
Melanitis zitenius (Herbst, 1796) – great evening brown

References 
"Melanitis Fabricius, 1807" at Markku Savela's Lepidoptera and Some Other Life Forms

 
Melanitini
Butterfly genera
Taxa named by Johan Christian Fabricius